Trevor John Carlin (born 13 March 1963) is a British motorsports team manager and owner. He currently owns motorsport outfit Rodin Carlin.

Carlin has had success in the junior motorsport formulas in a period spanning over 25 years.  Carlin's career began in International Formula Three. As Team Manager of Bowman Racing, he assembled a talented group of engineers and achieved 1st, 2nd and 3rd places in the British Formula Three Championship in the team's first three seasons and won the 1989 Macau Grand Prix with David Brabham driving.

In 1993, Carlin joined West Surrey Racing where he oversaw the racing programmes of Marc Gené, Cristiano da Matta and Pedro de la Rosa before negotiating the team's move into the British Touring Car Championship with Ford Motorsport.

In 1996, he formed his own team, Carlin Motorsport. The team have won the British Formula Three Championship nine times, the 2010 and 2011 Formula Renault 3.5 Series drivers' title and the 2011 Formula Renault 3.5 Teams' title and the 2014 GP3 Series teams' and drivers' titles.  The team also competed in Formula E (as Mahindra Racing) the GP2 Series, and will compete in the upcoming MSA Formula and began racing in America in 2015 in Indy Lights winning four races, including consecutive wins in the first three races of the season. In 2016 it won the Indy Lights' drivers championship with Ed Jones.

References

External links

Living people
1963 births
People from St Albans
British motorsport people
Sports car racing team owners
Formula One team principals
Formula E people
IndyCar Series team owners